Kolano (meaning "knee" in Polish) may refer to the following villages:
 Kolano, Lublin Voivodeship (east Poland)
 Kolano, Pomeranian Voivodeship (north Poland)